Pavni Reddy also known as Pavani is an Indian actress who predominantly appears in Tamil and Telugu films. She acted in a supporting role in the blockbuster film Thunivu (2023) opposing actor Ajith Kumar. In 2021, she was a contestant on the reality series Bigg Boss 5 Tamil and finished as the 2nd runner up. She is also known for playing the lead in the Tamil-language television series Chinna Thambi.

Reddy made her debut in the Hindi film Login playing the role as Seema. and later acted in various different films such as Amrutham Chandamamalo (2013), Vajram (2015), 465 (2017), Motta Shiva Ketta Shiva (2017), Premaku Raincheck (2018), July Kaatril (2019), Senapathi (2021), Malli Modalaindi (2022) and Thunivu (2023).

Career

Beginnings
Pavani made her silver screen debut with the Bollywood movie Login in 2012.  Reddy began her career as a model at age 21 before playing a village belle in Rettai Vaal Kuruvi. In 2016, she had also starred in EMI-Thavanai Murai Vazhkai. In 2017, she played the female lead in  Chinna Thambi and garnered acclaim for her performance. In 2018, she starred in the Malayalam language television series Neelakkuyil before being replaced by. In 2019, she portrayed one of the leads in Rasaathi, but was replaced by Debjani Modak. Besides, Pavani has acted in the Malayalam and Telugu TV shows including Neneu Aayana Aruguru Athalalu, Agni Poolu, Naa Peru Meenakshi and Srimathi. Later, she featured in movies like Double Trouble, Vajram, Motta Shiva Ketta Shiva and July Kaatril, to name a few. Pavani featured in the list of Chennai Times - 20 Most Desirable Women on TV 2019. She is a contestant in Bigg Boss (Tamil season 5) in 2021 later emerging as the 2nd runner up.

2023–present: Breakthrough with Thunivu
Pavani appeared in the high talked action film Thunivu (2023) opposing actor Ajith Kumar and Manju Warrier in the film. She was cast as one of the lead female roles in the film and was highly credited for her acting performance as a "bank robber" in the film.

Personal life 
She began dating Telugu actor Pradeep Kumar in 2016 after appearing in the Tamil television series Pasamalar. The pair were engaged in a ceremony in Hyderabad during late November 2016. She got married on February 14, 2017, marking the Valentine's Day. On May 17. 2017, Pradeep committed suicide and was found dead at his house in Puppalguda, Hyderabad.

In 2022, she is reportedly in relationship with  South Indian dancer and choreographer, Amir A D S after being together in  Bigg Boss Tamil 5 and BB Jodigal2 .

Filmography

Television

Awards and nominations

References

External links 

 

Living people
Tamil television actresses
Actresses in Tamil television
Actresses in Tamil cinema
Actresses in Telugu cinema
Indian television actresses
Indian film actresses
21st-century Indian actresses
Indian female models
Actresses in Malayalam television
Bigg Boss (Tamil TV series) contestants
Year of birth missing (living people)